Bishop Antoine-Charbel Tarabay, OLM (born 15 November 1967 in Tannourine, Lebanon) is the current Bishop of the Maronite Catholic Eparchy of Saint Maron of Sydney.

Life

Antoine Tarabay joined the Congregation of the Lebanese Maronite Order of Monks and on 17 October 1992 made his perpetual religious vows. Tarabay received on 11 July 1993 his ordination to the priesthood.

On April 17, 2013 Pope Francis appointed him bishop of the Eparchy of Saint Maron of Sydney. Maronite Patriarch of Antioch, Cardinal Bechara Boutros al-Rahi, OMM, ordained him on May 25 of the same year and his co-consecrators were the Archbishop of Beirut, Paul Youssef Matar, and the Bishop of Batroun, Mounir Khairallah.

References

External links
 Bishop Antoine-Charbel Tarabay [Catholic-Hierarchy]

1967 births
Lebanese Maronites
Living people
21st-century Maronite Catholic bishops
People from Tannourine